Krestova is a unincorporated community of about 150 people in the Kootenay region of British Columbia, Canada. The community was established by members of the Doukhobor religious group, who originally immigrated from Ukraine and Russia, in 1911-12. The name comes from the Russian "Dolina Krestova (Долина Крестова)", meaning "valley of the cross". The area is still home to the "Sons of Freedom" movement, which split from the Doukhobor community in the early 1900s.

Geography 
The town is located northwest of the confluence of the Slocan and Kootenay rivers, in the southern region of the province of British Columbia. It is part of the Electoral Area H of the Regional District of Central Kootenay. The nearest large towns are Castlegar to the southwest, and Nelson to the east.

History 
Krestova was the centre of decades of conflict between the Sons of Freedom, and the British Columbia government, the Royal Canadian Mounted Police (RCMP), and moderate Doukhobors. The Sons of Freedom, also known as "Freedomites", had moved to Krestova in 1929 and were opposed to many government requirements, especially compulsory public education.  Members burned down schools, public buildings, and their own homes - in the summer of 1953, 400 homes in the Krestova area were destroyed. Freedomites staged protests against government actions, often in the nude. In the 1950s, Freedomite children in Krestova were forcibly relocated by the RCMP to a residential school in New Denver, B.C. The provincial government issued a "statement of regret" for these actions in 2004.

References 

Populated places in the Regional District of Central Kootenay
Ukrainian diaspora in Canada